"Naked in the Rain" is a song that was originally performed by American country music artist Loretta Lynn. It was released as a single in June 1980 via MCA Records.

Background and reception 
"Naked in the Rain" was recorded at the Bradley's Barn in October 1979. Located in Mount Juliet, Tennessee, the session was produced by renowned country music producer Owen Bradley. Two additional tracks were recorded during this session, including Lynn's next previous single "Pregnant Again".

"Naked in the Rain" reached number thirty on the Billboard Hot Country Singles survey in 1980 Additionally, the song peaked at number eleven on the Canadian RPM Country Songs chart during this same period. It was included on her studio album, Loretta (1980).

Track listings 
7" vinyl single
 "Naked in the Rain" – 2:39
 "I Should Be Over You by Now"

Charts

References 

1980 songs
1980 singles
MCA Records singles
Loretta Lynn songs
Song recordings produced by Owen Bradley
Songs written by Buddy Cannon